A Time to Sing is a 1968 American drama film directed by Arthur Dreifuss and starring Hank Williams Jr. and Shelley Fabares. The film was originally known as The Hank Williams Jr Story. It was Fabares' fourth film for MGM.

Plot

Cast
Hank Williams Jr. as Grady Dodd
Shelley Fabares as Amy Carter
Ed Begley as Kermit Dodd
D'Urville Martin as Luke Harper
Donald Woods as Vernon Carter
Clara Ward as herself
Harold Ayer as Dr. Cartright
Dick Haynes as Master of Ceremonies
Gene Gentry as Master of Ceremonies
Liz Renay as Bar Girl (uncredited)
Charles Robinson as Shifty Barker (uncredited)

References

External links

1968 films
1968 drama films
American drama films
Films directed by Arthur Dreifuss
1960s English-language films
1960s American films